e-Racer is a video game for Microsoft Windows created by Rage Software.  It is a GT arcade racing game in which the player competes against computer opponents or other human players online in eight different cars. The single player game consists of an Arcade mode and a Championship mode, where one would have to race against 7 other computer opponents and would need to finish either first or second in each race in order to advance to the next round.

Original tracks
The original game contains thirteen tracks in Championship mode and a bonus track which is unlocked upon completion of the Championship mode.  All tracks are playable in both Arcade and Multiplayer modes.

In order, they are

 Town Centre - A road race through a town centre and mall.
 Scrap Yard - Off-road in a scrapyard.
 Freight Yard - A race through a freight train yard.
 Chemical Plant - Balance of off-road and on-road through a chemical factory.
 Aircraft Carrier - Race through and on an aircraft carrier and adjoining port.
 Stone Quarry - Off-road race through a stone quarry.
 Stately Home - Snow race near a fancy house.
 Grim Up North - Road race through narrow streets of a small town.
 Parking Lot - A race through a parking complex.
 Indy Oval - Race on a NASCAR circuit, but also off-road in the center.
 Hill Climb - Very snowy Circuit up and down a hill.
 Fishing Village - Go through a village, its adjoining fort and beach.
 The City - A race through a big city.

There is a bonus track called "Boy Racer". The first four tracks are unlocked from the beginning whilst the other tracks are unlocked by progressing through the Championship Mode.

Cars 
There are seven cars. The first two cars are unlocked upon the beginning; the other cars are unlocked upon coming first in Championship mode races.

In order of unlocking, they are:

 Itas Sprint-XS
 Exel Sportster
 Mantis VRS
 Proteus VVT
 Aero-Tech SX
 Ferreno GTV
 Dominator GTR

There is also a bonus car called the "Sand Scorcher".

Skins 
There are four liveries/decals for the cars. The skins have "sponsors" stickered onto them.

 A skin with a white front and a round transition into red at the back
 A full green skin
 A full white skin
 A skin with white at the front and a checkered-flag type transition into blue at the back.

2001 video games
Windows games
Windows-only games
Racing video games
Video games developed in the United Kingdom
Rage Games games